SH7 may refer to:

United States
Colorado State Highway 7
Oklahoma State Highway 7
Texas State Highway 7

Other countries
New Zealand State Highway 7
State Highway 7 (Karnataka), India
State Highway 7 (Rajasthan), a state highway in Rajasthan, India

See also
 List of highways numbered 7